Base unit may refer to:

 Base unit (measurement), in physics, a unit of measurement from which derived units may be compounded
 SI base unit, a base unit in the SI system
 An administrative unit of the United States Army Air Forces